Perouz Artin Kalfayan (15 March 1943 – 30 January 2016), better known as Feyrouz or Fayrouz, was an Egyptian film child actress.

Kalfayan was born in Cairo, Egypt, on 15 March 1943, to an Armenian Egyptian family, her ancestors fled Ottoman persecution and settled in Egypt. Her sister, Nelly Kalfaian, also entered the entertainment industry. Her birth name, Perouz, was an Armenian name, likely a form of Feyrouz. She began her acting career very young, making her debut at the age of 7 in the 1950 film Yasmine. Egyptian director Anwar Wagdi was helpful to her in her career. She ultimately retired from acting at 15, in 1959, to wed comedian Badreddine Gamgoum. The couple had two children together, Iman and Ayman.

Filmography
 1950: Yasmine (ياسمين)
 1951: Feyrouz Hanem (فيروز هانم)
 1952: Al Hirman (الحرمان)
 1952: Sourat az Zafaf (صورة الزفاف)
 1953: Dahab (دهب)
 1955: Asafir el Ganna (عصافير الجنة)
 1957: Ismail Yassine Tarazaan (إسماعيل يس طرزان)
 1958: Iyyami as Sa'eeda (أيامي السعيدة)
 1958: Ismail Yassine lil Beih'''  (اسماعيل يس للبيع)
 1959: Bafakkar fi lli Naseeni'' (بفكر قي اللى ناسينى) (her last role)

Awards
 In 2001, she was honored with "Lifetime Achievement Award" in Cairo Film Festival.

References

External links
 
 Bio in Arabic of Fayrouz and her sisters

Actresses from Cairo
Egyptian Christians
20th-century Egyptian actresses
Egyptian people of Armenian descent
1943 births
2016 deaths
Egyptian film actresses